These Are the New Good Times is the debut release from Pale Horse and Rider, a Jon DeRosa side-project with Marc Gartman. It was released in 2003 via Darla Records. Alan Sparhawk of Low and Nathan Amundson of Rivulets were guest performers on the recording.

Track listing
 "Jersey Coast Line" – 3:43
 "I Told Jesus Christ How Much I Love Her" – 3:54
 "Will We Be Blessed Someday" – 2:56
 "Sunday Matinee" – 4:03
 "Stars" – 5:23
 "Past Life" – 2:33
 "Aura Lee" – 3:33
 "Coney Island" – 2:01
 "Metropolitan Love Song" – 2:27
 "I Came Here Every Night" – 2:24
 "The Prettiest Girl I've Seen Tonight (So Far)" – 4:23

References

2003 debut albums
Pale Horse and Rider albums
Darla Records albums